Association Sportive Central Sport, is a football club from Papeete, Tahiti, French Polynesia.

Honours
Tahiti Ligue 1
Champions (21): 1955, 1958, 1962, 1963, 1964, 1965, 1966, 1967, 1972, 1973, 1974, 1975, 1976, 1977, 1978, 1979, 1981, 1982, 1983, 1985, 2017–18

Tahiti Cup:
Winners (18): 1950, 1953, 1954, 1957, 1961, 1962, 1966, 1967, 1972, 1973, 1975, 1976, 1977, 1979, 1981, 1983, 1988, 1995

Tahiti Coupe des Champions
Winners: 2018

Recent seasons

Continental record

Current squad
Squad for the 2020-21 Tahiti Ligue 1:

Staff

Former players

  César Castillo

References

External links
Official website

Association football clubs established in 1938
1938 establishments in French Polynesia
Football clubs in Tahiti
Football clubs in French Polynesia